The  were a class of nine destroyers of the Imperial Japanese Navy.  Some authors consider the Nokaze, Kamikaze and es to be extensions of the s, and the Kamikaze class is sometimes referred to as the "Kiyokaze class" to distinguish it from the earlier World War I-era destroyer class of the same name. Obsolete by the beginning of the Pacific War, the Kamikazes were relegated to mostly secondary roles. Most ultimately were lost to U.S. submarines.

Background
The Kamikaze-class vessels were an extension and improvement to the ongoing Minekaze-class program as part of the Eight-eight fleet Plan. They were ordered under the 1921-1922 fiscal budget.

Construction of the last two planned Kamikaze vessels was cancelled in conformance with the Washington Naval Treaty. Oite, Hayate, Asanagi and Yūnagi were called the Kamikaze-class late production model (or occasionally Oite-class), as the powerplant and armaments were different.

Design

The Kamikaze-class ships were visually identical to the earlier Minekaze class, apart from slight detail changes in the bridge. The Kamikaze class was the first destroyer class in the Imperial Japanese Navy to be built with a bridge strengthened by steel plating. This gave the vessels a higher center of gravity, and to counteract this they were built with an increased displacement and a wider beam for better stability. Although they had slightly less speed > they were considered satisfactory compared with the Minekaze class.

Armament
The Kamikaze-class ships were essentially the same design as the Nokaze sub-class of the previous Minekaze-class destroyers. The three twin  torpedo tubes (one positioned in the well in front of the bridge and the other two located abaft the second stack) was unchanged; however, the launchers were now power-operated rather than manually-operated. The main battery was also unchanged, with four Type 3 120 mm 45 caliber naval guns in single open mounts, exposed to the weather except for a small shield. For anti-aircraft protection, the 6,5 mm machine guns mounted on each side of the bridge were replaced by two single 7.7mm machine guns. The final three vessels in the Kamikaze-class were also equipped with depth charges, with two Type 81 launchers deployed on the stern.

Following the start of the Pacific War, the Kamikaze-class vessels were modified for enhanced anti-aircraft capability at the expense of speed and surface warfare performance. One of both of the aft guns and the aft torpedo launcher were replaced by Type 96 25-mm anti-aircraft guns, which were added in increasing numbers, and eventually totaled between 13 and 20 guns per vessel in a combination of single and twin mounts. These modifications increased the displacement on some vessels to 1,523 tons, which reduced their maximum speed down to 35 knots.

Operational history
The Kamikaze-class vessels all saw combat during the Pacific War, with Hayate having the distinction of being the first Japanese destroyer to be lost in combat during that conflict. She was sunk during the Battle of Wake Island in December 1941. By 1944 four Kamikaze-class vessels had been sunk by American submarines and a fifth was lost in an air raid on Truk. In 1945 a sixth ship was sunk by submarine action.  Only Kamikaze and Harukaze survived the war, but Harukaze was in such poor condition when surrendered at Sasebo that she was soon scrapped. Kamikaze continued on as a repatriation ship after it was surrendered at Singapore, but grounded off Cape Omaezaki in June 1946 and was written off.

Class members
Note these vessels only carried numbers ("Dai") until 1 August 1928, when they were given meteorological names.

Naming history
The IJN originally planned that the Kamikaze-class ships should have names, but upon completion they were given numbers due to the projected large number of warships the IJN expected to build through the Eight-eight fleet plan. This proved to be extremely unpopular with the crews and was a constant source of confusion in communications. In August 1928, names were assigned, but not the original names that were planned.

Notes

References

Books

External links

 Japanese Destroyers: Tabular Movement Records (TROMs)
  Kamikaze Class, Japanese Destroyers

Destroyer classes
 
World War II destroyers of Japan